The 2022 Centennial Cup, presented by Tim Hortons was the Canadian Junior Hockey League (CJHL) championship for the 2021–22 season and the 50th Canadian junior A ice hockey national championship, played at Affinity Place  in Estevan, Saskatchewan from May 18 to 29, 2022.  It was the first year the event has been played since 2019 and also the first since its name reverted to the Centennial Cup. The Brooks Bandits defeated the Pickering Panthers in the championship game to win the national title.

As a result of scheduling conflicts arising from the COVID-19 pandemic, all regional championships were canceled by Hockey Canada and all nine CJHL league champions and the host team, Estevan Bruins, participated in the tournament, the first time this format had ever been used.

Qualifying Teams
Alberta Junior Hockey League

Brooks Bandits qualify as Inter Pipeline Cup AJHL Champions.

Regular Season: 52-6-2 (1st AJHL)
Playoffs: Defeated Canmore Eagles 4-0, Defeated Okotoks Oilers 4-0, Defeated Spruce Grove Saints 4-1;

Saskatchewan Junior Hockey League

Estevan Bruins qualify as hosts.
Regular Season: 43-10-2-3 (1st SJHL)
Playoffs: Defeated Notre Dame Hounds 4-1, Defeated Yorkton Terriers 4-0, Defeated Flin Flon Bombers 4-3;
Flin Flon Bombers qualify as SJHL representatives as Canalta Cup champions (Estevan Bruins) are the host team.
Regular Season: 34-21-2-1 (5th SJHL)
Playoffs: Defeated Battlefords North Stars 4-2, Defeated Humboldt Broncos 4-1, Defeated by Estevan Bruins 4-3;

Manitoba Junior Hockey League

Dauphin Kings qualify as Turnbull Cup champions
Regular Season: 41-12-1-0 (2nd MJHL)
Playoffs: Defeated Swan Valley Stampeders 4-2, Defeated Winkler Flyers 4-1, Defeated Steinbach Pistons 4-3;

Superior International Junior Hockey League

Red Lake Miners qualify as Bill Salonen Cup champions

Regular Season: 28-6-2-1 (2nd SIJHL)
Playoffs: Defeated Dryden Ice Dogs 4-2, Defeated Kam River Fighting Walleye 4-2

Northern Ontario Junior Hockey League

Soo Thunderbirds qualified as Copeland Cup – McNamara Trophy champions

Regular Season: 38-5-2-3 (1st NOJHL)
Playoffs: Defeated Blind River Beavers 4-0, Defeated Soo Eagles 4-0, Defeated Hearst Lumberjacks 4-3

Ontario Junior Hockey League

Pickering Panthers qualified as Frank L. Buckland Trophy Champions

Regular Season: 39-11-0-4 (2nd OJHL)
Playoffs: Defeated Stouffville Spirit 2-0, Defeated Collingwood Blues 2-0, Defeated Milton Menace 3-0, Defeated Toronto Jr. Canadiens 4-3.

Central Canada Hockey League

Ottawa Jr. Senators qualified as Bogart Cup Champions 

Regular Season: 43-8-2-2 (1st CCHL)
Playoffs: Defeated Smiths Falls Bears 4-0, Defeated Renfrew Wolves 4-1, Hawkesbury Hawks 4-3

Quebec Junior Hockey League

Longueuil Collège Français qualified as NAPA Cup champions 

Regular Season: 34-4-3-0 (1st LJAAAQ)
Playoffs: Defeated Granby Inouk 4-2, Defeated Terrebonne Cobras 4-1, Defeated Cégep Beauce-Appalaches Condors 4-1;

Maritime Junior A Hockey League

Summerside Western Capitals qualified as Canadian Tire Cup champions 
Regular Season: 31-4-1-2 (1st MHL)
Playoffs: Defeated Edmundston Blizzard 4-1, Defeated Fredericton Red Wings 4-0, Defeated Truro Bearcats 4-1

Schedule

All time Mountain Time.

Playoffs

Reference

External links
Official website

2022